Aaron Poole (born March 17, 1977) is a Canadian actor.

Early life
Poole grew up in Barrie, Ontario and attended Barrie Central Collegiate. He is a graduate of the Etobicoke School of the Arts and George Brown College. He is of Italian descent.

Career
Poole's credits include the films Killing Zelda Sparks, Adoration and This Beautiful City, and the television series Strange Days at Blake Holsey High and ZOS: Zone of Separation. He was nominated for Best Actor at the 29th Genie Awards for his performance in This Beautiful City. Poole starred in Ed Gass-Donnelly's second feature film Small Town Murder Songs in 2010. He also appeared in the movie Fury.

Poole is an executive producer and one of the lead actors in The Conspiracy, a mockumentary thriller which opened at one location in Toronto on July 19, 2013, and is expected to hit other major cities in Canada a few weeks later, followed by some U.S. cities.

The latest project he worked on was a film called Forsaken  with Donald and Kiefer Sutherland.

Filmography

Film

 Blind Faith (1998) as White Kid #1
 All I Wanna Do (1998) as Beagle - Flat Critter
 The Safety of Objects (2001) as Z-100 Judge
 The Circle (2002) as Smitty Jacobson
 The House (2006) as Duncan
 Killing Zelda Sparks (2007) as Ryan Bladder
 This Beautiful City (2007) as Johnny
 Adoration (2008) as Daniel
 Gangster Exchange (2010) as Big Dave
 Small Town Murder Songs (2010) as Jim
 The Samaritan (2012) as Jake
 The Conspiracy (2012) as Aaron
 Margo Lily (2012, Short) as Rob
 The Last Will and Testament of Rosalind Leigh (2012) as Leon Leigh / Surveillance Expert
 The Animal Project (2013) as Leo
 Cas & Dylan (2013) as Steve
 The Captive (2014) as Mike
 Relative Happiness (2014) as Joss
 No Stranger Than Love (2015) as Jamie Whyte
 Forsaken (2015) as Frank Tillman
 The Void (2016) as Daniel Carter
 The Definites (2017) as Abe
 The Scent of Rain and Lightning (2017) as Meryl Tapper
 Mary Goes Round (2017) as Pete
 Spiral (2019) as Liam
 Disappearance at Clifton Hill (2019)
 Tainted (2020) as Malick
 Flashback (2020) as Pierced Man
 Stardust (2020) as Mick Ronson
 The Empty Man (2020) as Paul
 The Young Arsonists (2020) as Dale

Television
 Living in Your Car (2010-2011) as Toby
 King (2011) as Jason Collier
 Republic of Doyle (2011-2014) as Chad King
 Flashpoint (2011) as Davis Lagosto
 Copper (2012-2013) as Robert Cobb Kennedy
 The Listener (2013) as Jay Levinson
 Strange Empire (2014-2015) as Captain John Slotter
 Murdoch Mysteries (2018) as Frank Lloyd Wright
 Frankie Drake (2019) S3:E2 as Constable Crowley
 The Communist's Daughter (2021)
 Faith Heist (2021) as Jack

Awards and nominations

References

External links

1977 births
Living people
20th-century Canadian male actors
21st-century Canadian male actors
Canadian male film actors
Canadian male television actors
Canadian Screen Award winners
George Brown College alumni
Male actors from Ontario
People from Barrie